The 1954 UCI Track Cycling World Championships were the World Championship for track cycling. They took place in Cologne and Wuppertal, West Germany from 27 to 29 August 1954. Five events for men were contested, 3 for professionals and 2 for amateurs.

Medal summary

Medal table

See also
 1954 UCI Road World Championships

References

Track cycling
UCI Track Cycling World Championships by year
International sports competitions hosted by West Germany
Sports competitions in Cologne
1954 in track cycling